The 1981 New Zealand general election, held on 28 November 1981, was a nationwide vote to determine the shape of the 40th New Zealand Parliament. It saw the governing National Party, led by Robert Muldoon, win a third term in office, but the opposition Labour Party, led by Bill Rowling, won the largest share of the votes cast. Social Credit also won over 20% of the vote- their best result ever- but received no new seats. This was the second consecutive election in which National lost the popular vote to Labour. More electorates were rural and right-leaning than urban and progressive, and therefore National benefitted under the first-past-the-post electoral system. The fact the unpopular Muldoon was able to continue to govern anyway was a major catalyst for the growing public desire to reform New Zealand's electoral system. This happened within fifteen years, when the 1996 election was the first to use mixed-member proportional representation. 

Notable MPs first elected at this election include future Labour Party leader and current Mayor of Auckland Phil Goff, the first Māori Speaker of the House Peter Tapsell, future Finance Minister Michael Cullen, and future Prime Minister Helen Clark. Future Minister of Foreign Affairs and New Zealand First leader Winston Peters lost his seat of Hunua at this election to Colin Moyle of the Labour Party, whom Robert Muldoon had aggressively accused of being gay as part of a McCarthyist smear campaign in 1977.

Background
Before the election, the National Party governed with 50 seats, while the opposition Labour Party held 40 seats. The Social Credit Party held two (one of which had been taken from National in a recent by-election). The National Party had won a landslide victory in the 1975 election, but in the 1978 election, although remaining in office, had lost ground. The style of Robert Muldoon's leadership was growing increasingly unpopular, both with his party and with the public, and there had been an abortive leadership challenge by Brian Talboys in 1980. Some commentators believed that the 1981 election would mark an end to Muldoon's government.

Some pundits have since claimed that the Springbok Tour increased votes for National in provincial electorates, despite the tour not being seen as a major election issue.

The opposition Labour Party was led by Bill Rowling, who had been leader of the party in the past two elections. While Rowling had performed poorly against Muldoon in 1975, and was generally viewed by the public as weak, he had gradually recovered a measure of public respect. In the previous election, Labour had won a plurality of the vote, but did not win a majority of the seats. Many believed that this time, Labour would manage to convert its support into seats, although that did prove not to be the case.

Not all of Muldoon's opponents gave their support to Rowling and the Labour Party, however. The small Social Credit Party, traditionally New Zealand's "third party", was enjoying strong support, but the first-past-the-post electoral system made it difficult for Social Credit to win seats. After the East Coast Bays by-election, Social Credit reached as high as 30% in opinion polls, but it then declined.

MPs retiring in 1981
Five National MPs and seven Labour MPs intended to retire at the end of the 39th Parliament.

Election day
The election was held on 28 November. 2,034,747 people were registered to vote, and 91.4% turned out. That was a markedly higher turnout than recorded for the previous election, but as the official statistics for that election are regarded as highly misleading, the comparison is probably not valid. It is likely that turnout in the 1981 election was about the same as in the election before it.

Summary of results
The 1981 election saw the National Party win 47 of the 92 seats in parliament, a drop of three from before the election (National lost Hunua, Kapiti, Miramar and Wellington Central but won Taupo). This meant that National kept its majority by only a single seat, which became highly problematic over the next parliamentary term. The Labour Party won 43 seats, a gain of three (Labour won Hunua, Kapiti, Miramar and Wellington Central but lost Taupo). The Social Credit Party managed to retain its two seats, East Coast Bays and Rangitikei. No party initially held a majority until a recount flipped the seat of Gisborne from Labour to National, which gave National a working majority of one.

For the second election in a row, Labour won more votes than National, but fewer seats, allowing National to retain government despite not winning the popular vote. Social Credit won more than 20% of the popular vote but only two seats. This result, and that of 1978, contributed to New Zealand adopting the Mixed Member Proportional system of proportional representation in the 1990s.

Detailed results

Party totals

Votes summary

Individual electorate results
The tables below shows the results of the 1981 general election:

Key

|-
 |colspan=8 style="background-color:#FFDEAD" | General electorates
|-

|-
 | Hauraki
 | style="background-color:;" |
 | style="text-align:center;" | Leo Schultz
 | style="background-color:;" |
 | style="text-align:center;background-color:;" | Graeme Lee
 | style="text-align:right;" | 1,787
 | style="background-color:;" |
 | style="text-align:center;" | Gordon Miller
|-

|-
 |colspan=8 style="background-color:#FFDEAD" | Māori electorates
|-

|}
Table footnotes:

Summary of changes
The seats of Hunua, Kapiti, Miramar and Wellington Central were won from incumbent National MPs by Labour challengers. The challengers in question were Colin Moyle, Margaret Shields, Peter Neilson and Fran Wilde, respectively. The defeated incumbents were Winston Peters, Barry Brill, Bill Young and Ken Comber, respectively.
The seat of Taupo was won from the incumbent Labour MP by a National challenger. The challenger was Roger McClay and the defeated incumbent was Jack Ridley.
The seats of Heretaunga, Mt. Albert, Napier, Palmerston North, Roskill, St. Kilda and Northern Maori passed from incumbent Labour MPs to new Labour MPs.
In Nelson, Mel Courtney achieved the best result by an Independent candidate in a New Zealand election in nearly forty years.
The seats of Fendalton, Hauraki, Selwyn and Whangarei passed from incumbent National MPs to new National MPs. Two of these changes were the result of MPs retiring, but two (in Selwyn and Whangarei) were the result of controversial challenges to the re-selection of the incumbents. In Selwyn, Ruth Richardson successfully challenged the re-nomination of incumbent Colin McLachlan, and in Whangarei, John Banks successfully challenged the re-nomination of incumbent John Elliott.

Notes

References

 
November 1981 events in New Zealand